Crocodylus is a genus of true crocodiles in the family Crocodylidae.

Taxonomy
The generic name, Crocodylus, was proposed by Josephus Nicolaus Laurenti in 1768. Crocodylus contains 13–14 extant (living) species and 5 extinct species. There are additional extinct species attributed to the genus Crocodylus that studies have shown no longer belong, although they have not yet been reassigned to new genera.

Extant species
The 13–14 living species are:

Fossils
Crocodylus also includes five extinct species:
 † Crocodylus anthropophagus is an extinct crocodile from Plio-Pleistocene of Tanzania. 
 † Crocodylus checchiai is an extinct crocodile from Late Miocene of Kenya.
 † Crocodylus falconensis is an extinct crocodile from Early Pliocene of Venezuela.
 † Crocodylus palaeindicus is an extinct crocodile the Miocene to the Pleistocene of southern Asia.
 † Crocodylus thorbjarnarsoni is an extinct crocodile from Plio-Pleistocene of Kenya.

Evolution
Crocodylus likely originated in Africa and radiated outwards towards Southeast Asia and the Americas, although an Australia/Asia origin has also been considered. Phylogenetic evidence supports Crocodylus diverging from its closest recent relative, the extinct Voay of Madagascar, around 25 million years ago, near the Oligocene/Miocene boundary.

Phylogeny
A 2018 tip dating study by Lee & Yates simultaneously using morphological, molecular (DNA sequencing), and stratigraphic (fossil age) data established the inter-relationships within Crocodylidae.  In 2021, Hekkala et al. were able to use paleogenomics, extracting DNA from the extinct Voay, to better establish the relationships within Crocodylidae, including the subfamilies Crocodylinae and Osteolaeminae.

The below cladogram shows the results of the latest study:

References

Crocodylidae
Extant Miocene first appearances
Reptile genera
Taxa named by Josephus Nicolaus Laurenti